Tingkhong Assembly constituency is one of the 126 assembly constituencies of Assam Legislative Assembly. Tingkhong forms part of the Dibrugarh Lok Sabha constituency.

Members of Legislative Assembly 
 1967: B. Gogoi, Samyukta Socialist Party
 1972: Rajendra Nath Phukan, Indian National Congress
 1978: Bhadreswar Gogoi, Janata Party
 1985: Atul Chandra Koch, Independent
 1991: Prithibi Majhi, Indian National Congress
 1996: Atuwa Munda, Indian National Congress
 2001: Atuwa Munda, Indian National Congress
 2006: Anup Phukan, Asom Gana Parishad
 2011: Atuwa Munda, Indian National Congress
 2016: Bimal Bora, Bharatiya Janata Party
 2021: Bimal Bora, Bharatiya Janata Party

Election results

2016 result

2011 result

References

External links 
 

Assembly constituencies of Assam